Jack's Jump is a subglacial volcano in east-central British Columbia, Canada, located in south-central Wells Gray Provincial Park.

See also
 List of volcanoes in Canada
 Volcanism of Canada
 Volcanism of Western Canada

References

Subglacial volcanoes of Canada
Volcanoes of British Columbia
One-thousanders of British Columbia
Pleistocene volcanoes
Monogenetic volcanoes